The Peat Moors Centre lay on the road between  Shapwick and Westhay in Somerset, England. The centre was run by the Somerset Historic Environment Service, but Somerset County Council closed it in October 2009 in the course of budget cuts.

The museum was dedicated to the archaeology, history and geology of the Somerset Levels. It also included reconstructions of some of the archaeological discoveries, including a number of Iron Age round houses from Glastonbury Lake Village, and the world's oldest engineered highway, the Sweet Track. From time to time the centre offered courses in a number of ancient technologies in subjects including textiles, clothing and basket making, as well as staging various open days, displays and demonstrations.

Somerset County Council, the owners of the Peat Moors Centre, closed the centre for budgetary reasons on 31 October 2009. The former staff hoped to launch a successor to the centre,  run by a community interest company, to be known as the 'Somerset Lake Village Project' and involving the reconstruction of an Iron Age lake village.

See also
 Somerset Levels

References

External links 
Centre web site
Megalithic Portal

Museums in Somerset
Somerset Levels
History of Somerset
Archaeological museums in England
Defunct museums in England
Thatched buildings in Somerset